Mountain of Destiny is a 1924 German silent drama film written and directed by Arnold Fanck and starring Hannes Schneider, Frida Richard, Erna Morena, and Luis Trenker. The film is about an alpinist who falls to his death while climbing a dangerous peak. His son later succeeds where his father had failed. The film was released in the United Kingdom with the title The Mountaineers. After seeing Mountain of Destiny, Leni Riefenstahl, then a dancer, decided she wanted to start appearing in films. She got in touch with Fanck and starred in his 1926 film The Holy Mountain.

Plot
After a mountaineer is killed attempting to climb a difficult mountain, his son dreams of conquering the peak that has defeated his father. But his mother makes him promise never to attempt it. Events eventually force her to release him from the promise, and he ascends the mountain successfully.

Cast
Hannes Schneider as Bergsteiger
Frida Richard as Bergsteiger's mother
Erna Morena as Bergsteiger's wife
Luis Trenker as Bergsteiger's son
Gustav Oberg as Freund des Bergsteigers
Hertha von Walther as Hella, Bergsteiger's daughter
Werner Schaarschmidt as unknown climber
H. von Hoeslin as unknown climber

References

External links

1924 films
1920s adventure drama films
German adventure drama films
Films of the Weimar Republic
German silent feature films
Films directed by Arnold Fanck
Mountaineering films
German black-and-white films
Films set in the Alps
1924 drama films
Silent adventure drama films
1920s German films